Freddie McGregor (born 27 June 1956, in Clarendon, Jamaica) is a Jamaican singer, musician and record producer. His music career began when he was seven years old.

Biography
In 1963 he joined with Ernest Wilson and Peter Austin to form The Clarendonians, and began to record for the Studio One label. He was only seven years old at the time and was known as 'Little Freddie'. He was also a member of the Generation Gap. 

McGregor converted to Rastafari in 1975. He is a member of the Twelve Tribes organisation.

McGregor worked with producer Niney the Observer during the late 1970s and early 1980s, and in the same period was part of the resurgence of Studio One. His popularity soared in the early 1980s with the release of "Bobby Babylon". Other popular hits of McGregor's include "Big Ship", "Push Comes to Shove", "Just Don't Want to Be Lonely" (a top ten hit in the UK), and "I Was Born a Winner"; as well as cover versions of many early reggae standards. He has also worked with producers Junjo Lawes, Linval Thompson, and Gussie Clarke. McGregor has also recorded as a drummer with artists such as Sugar Minott and Judy Mowatt.

McGregor has also toured extensively for many years. He secured a licensing agreement with RAS Records in US and released Come on Over in 1983.

McGregor's albums in the 2000s were Signature and Anything for You, which received a Grammy nomination.

He established the Big Ship label in 1983, and has produced many artists including Papa San, Lieutenant Stitchie, Tiger, Luciano and Mikey Spice.

In a 2011 interview, he expressed concern that many veteran artists, including himself, struggled for local radio play of their newer material, which he felt may be "lost" over time as a result.

His album Di Captain, released in August 2012, featured Etana and Gappy Ranks.

In 2013, he received a Marcus Garvey Lifetime Achievement Award from the Institute of Caribbean Studies.

One of McGregor's three sons, Stephen "Di Genius" McGregor, is a dancehall record producer. More recently, he had signed a deal with Warner Chappell Music.

Discography

Albums
Bobby Babylon (1979), Studio One
Mr. McGregor aka Freddie McGregor (1979), Observer/Jackal/56 Hope Rd/Mercury
Lovers Rock (Showcase Jamaica Style) (1981), Live & Love
Roots Man Skanking (1982) Clocktower
I Am Ready (1982), Coxsone/Studio One
Love at First Sight (1982), Intense
Big Ship (1982)
Come on Over (1983), RAS
Rhythm So Nice (1983), Thompson Sounds
Across the Border (1984), RAS
All in the Same Boat (1986), RAS
Freddie McGregor (1987), Polydor
Don't Want to Be Lonely Studio One
Live at the Town & Country Club (1991), VP
FM (1992), High Times
Live in London 1991 (1993), Charly
Sing Jamaican Classics Vol.1 
Masterpiece (1997), VP
Jamaican Classics Vol.2 (1998), Big Ship
Magic in the Air (1999), Big Ship
Zion Chant (1999), Heartbeat
Signature (2000), VP
Rumours (2000), Greensleeves
Carry Go Bring Come (2000), Greensleeves
Hard to Get (2000), Greensleeves
Forever My Love (2000), RAS
Push On (2002), Big Ship
Lovers Rock (2003), Prestige
Anything for You (2002), VP
Reggae Max (2003), Jet Star
Heart Is Willing (2003), Charm
Rhythms of My Heart (2004), Nuff
Comin' in Tough  (2005), VP
Mister Eudaric Riddim (2009)
Mr.McGregor (2009), VP
Giants (2009), Joe Gibbs Publishing
Di Captain (2013), VP
True to My Roots (2016), Big Ship/VP

UK hit singles
The following were hits on the UK Singles Chart:

DVDs and videos

Freddie McGregor releases
Live Video Music, Inc. (DVD)

Various artists releases featuring McGregor
A Reggae Christmas (1988) RAS
Sunsplash '90 – Reggae Rockers (1990) Wienerworld (DVD)
The Reggae Movie (1996) Geneon (DVD)
Golden Voices of Reggae (2005) Island MVD (DVD)
Western Consciousness Pt 2 (2005) Island MVD (DVD)
iDrop Riddim (aka Rootstime Riddim) (2013) Rootstime production / Asani Ali music

See also
List of reggae musicians
List of roots reggae artists
List of performers on Top of the Pops
VP Records
Rastafari movement

References

External links

1956 births
Living people
Jamaican reggae musicians
Jamaican male singers
Jamaican record producers
People from Clarendon Parish, Jamaica
Jamaican Rastafarians
Trojan Records artists
Converts to the Rastafari movement
VP Records artists
Heartbeat Records artists